West Virginia State Board of Education v. Barnette, 319 U.S. 624 (1943), is a landmark decision by the United States Supreme Court holding that the Free Speech Clause of the First Amendment protects students from being forced to salute the American flag or say the Pledge of Allegiance in public school. The court's 6–3 decision, delivered by Justice Robert H. Jackson, is remembered for its forceful defense of free speech and constitutional rights generally as being placed "beyond the reach of majorities and officials".

Barnette overruled a 1940 decision on the same issue, Minersville School District v. Gobitis, in which the court had stated that the proper recourse for dissent was to try to change the public school policy democratically. This overruling was a significant court victory won by Jehovah's Witnesses, whose religion forbade them from saluting or pledging to symbols, including symbols of political institutions. The court did not address the effect the compelled salutation and recital ruling had upon their particular religious beliefs but instead ruled that the state did not have the power to compel speech in that manner for anyone. In overruling Gobitis, the court primarily relied on the Free Speech Clause of the First Amendment rather than the Free Exercise Clause.

Background 

In the 1930s, the leader of the Jehovah's Witnesses, Joseph Franklin Rutherford, began objecting to U.S. state laws requiring school students to salute the flag as a means of instilling patriotism, and in 1936 he declared that baptized Jehovah's Witnesses who did salute the flag were breaking their covenant with God and were committing idolatry. 

In the United States, children of Jehovah's Witnesses had been expelled from school and were threatened with exclusion for no other cause. Officials threatened to send them to reformatories maintained for criminally inclined juveniles. Parents of such children had been prosecuted and were being threatened with prosecutions for causing delinquency. In 1935, nine-year-old Carlton Nichols was expelled from school and his father arrested in Lynn, Massachusetts, for such a refusal. Additional refusals followed, one such leading to Minersville School District v. Gobitis (1940). Even after the Gobitis decision, Jehovah's Witnesses continued to refuse to say the pledge and continued to be expelled from schools. In 1942, the West Virginia Board of Education formed a regulation that was perceived as directly targeting Jehovah's Witnesses, as it required schoolchildren to salute the flag and extensively quoted the Gobitis case, including "conscientious scruples have not in the long struggle for religious toleration relieved the individual from obedience to the general law not aimed at the promotion or restriction of religious beliefs". The West Virginia Supreme Court refused to force the school board from requiring children to salute the flag, which led to the federal lawsuit being filed.

Facts of the case 
Following the Gobitis decision, the West Virginia Legislature amended its statutes to require all schools in the state to conduct courses of instruction in history, civics, and the constitutions of the United States and of the state "for the purpose of teaching, fostering and perpetuating the ideals, principles and spirit of Americanism, and increasing the knowledge of the organization and machinery of the government". The West Virginia state board of education was directed to "prescribe the courses of study covering these subjects" for public schools.

The board of education on January 9, 1942, adopted a resolution containing recitals taken largely from the Supreme Court's Gobitis opinion and ordering that the salute to the flag become "a regular part of the program of activities in the public schools" and that all teachers and pupils "shall be required to participate in the salute honoring the Nation represented by the Flag; provided, however, that refusal to salute the Flag be regarded as an Act of insubordination, and shall be dealt with accordingly".

The resolution originally required the "commonly accepted salute to the Flag", which it defined. Objections to the salute (the Bellamy salute, see image) as "being too much like Hitler's" were raised by a variety of organizations, including the Parent and Teachers Association, the Boy Scouts and Girl Scouts, the Red Cross, and the General Federation of Women's Clubs. Some modification appears to have been made in deference to these objections, but no concession was made to Jehovah's Witnesses. What was required after the modification was a "stiff-arm" salute, the saluter to keep the right hand raised with palm turned up while the following is repeated: "I pledge allegiance to the Flag of the United States of America and to the Republic for which it stands; one nation, indivisible, with liberty and justice for all."

Failure to comply was considered "insubordination" and dealt with by expulsion. Readmission was denied by statute until the student complied. This expulsion, in turn, automatically exposed the child and their parents to criminal prosecution; the expelled child was considered "unlawfully absent" and could be proceeded against as a delinquent, and their parents or guardians could be fined as much as $50 and jailed up to thirty days.

Marie and Gathie Barnett were Jehovah's Witnesses attending Slip Hill Grade School near Charleston, West Virginia, who were instructed by their father not to salute the flag or recite the pledge, and were expelled for their refusal. On the advice of an early attorney, Horace S. Meldahl of Charleston, the Barnetts had avoided the further complications by having their expelled girls return to school each day, though the school would send them home.

The Barnetts brought suit in the United States District Court for the Southern District of West Virginia for themselves and others similarly situated, asking its injunction to restrain enforcement of these laws and regulations against Jehovah's Witnesses, and prevailed, with the three-judge panel stating:

The school district subsequently appealed.

Arguments 
The board's argument was that the plaintiffs raised no substantial federal question, and their brief relied extensively on Justice Frankfurter's Gobitis opinion.

Hayden Covington answered the state's appeal in a brief that was a mixture of Jehovah's Witnesses Bible teachings and constitutional arguments. He explicitly called for the overturning of the Gobitis opinion, especially rejecting Justice Frankfurter's deference to legislative policymaking authority. Such deference, he argued, allowed the legislature to define its own powers. He emphasized the nationwide persecution of Jehovah's Witnesses that had followed Gobitis and concluded with a long list of law journal and newspaper articles that criticized the decision. The American Bar Association's Committee on the Bill of Rights and the American Civil Liberties Union filed amicus curiae  briefs that argued Gobitis was bad law and should be overruled.

It was widely expected that Gobitis would be overturned. The resignation of James Byrnes the previous year, and Franklin D. Roosevelt's subsequent appointment of Wiley Rutledge, had created a shift on views of the First Amendment—for instance, the Court overturned a precedent set a mere nine months prior in Jones v. City of Opelika (1942) through its ruling in Murdock v. Pennsylvania (1943).

Decision of the court 
The court held, in a 6–3 decision delivered by Justice Jackson, that it was unconstitutional for public schools to compel students to salute the flag. It thus overruled its decision in Minersville School District v. Gobitis (1940), finding that the flag salute was "a form of utterance" and "a primitive but effective means of communicating ideas". The court wrote that any "compulsory unification of opinion" was doomed to failure and was antithetical to the values set forth in the First Amendment. The court stated:

The Supreme Court announced its decision on June 14, Flag Day.

Majority opinion 

The opinion that Justice Felix Frankfurter had authored three years earlier in Gobitis rested on four arguments. In Barnette Justice Jackson addressed each element of Frankfurter's Gobitis decision. Jackson began with Frankfurter's designation of the flag as a national symbol. He did not question Frankfurter's designation of the flag as a national symbol; instead, he criticized the pedestal on which Frankfurter put such national symbols. Jackson called symbols a "primitive but effective way of communicating ideas" and explained that "a person gets from a symbol the meaning he puts into it, and what is one man's comfort and inspiration is another's jest and scorn".

Next, Jackson denied Frankfurter's argument that flag-saluting ceremonies were an appropriate way to build the "cohesive sentiment" that Frankfurter believed national unity depended on. Jackson rejected Frankfurter's argument, citing the Roman effort to drive out Christianity, the Spanish Inquisition of the Jews, and the Siberian exile of Soviet dissidents as evidence of the "ultimate futility" of efforts to coerce unanimous sentiment out of a populace. Jackson warned that  who begin coercive elimination of dissent soon find themselves exterminating dissenters. Compulsory unification of opinion achieves only the unanimity of the graveyard".

Then Jackson dealt with Frankfurter's assertion that forcing students to salute the flag, and threatening them with expulsion if they chose not to, was a permissible way to foster national unity. Jackson's rejection of this section of Frankfurter's argument has proved the most quoted section of his opinion. In his Gobitis opinion Frankfurter's solution was for the dissenters to seek out solutions to their problems at the ballot box. Jackson responded that the conflict, in this case, was between authority and the individual, and that the Founders had intended the Bill of Rights to put some rights out of reach from majorities, ensuring that some liberties would endure beyond political majorities. Jackson wrote:

The last leg of Frankfurter's Gobitis opinion reasoned that matters like saluting the flag were issues of "school discipline" that are better left to local officials rather than federal judges. Justice Jackson rejected this argument as well:

Concurring opinion 
Two of the justices who changed their minds between Minersville and West Virginia v. Barnette—Hugo Black and William O. Douglas—would become the most ardent supporters of the First Amendment.

Black and Douglas in a concurring opinion:

Words uttered under coercion are proof of loyalty to nothing but self-interest ... Love of country must spring from willing hearts and free minds, inspired by a fair administration of wise laws enacted by the people's elected representatives within the bounds of express constitutional prohibitions.

Dissenting opinion 

Three years earlier, seven justices had followed Frankfurter's reasoning and joined his majority opinion in Gobitis. In Barnette, however, only Frankfurter filed a written dissent. Neither Justice Owen Roberts nor Stanley Reed wrote a dissenting opinion.

Frankfurter said that the court was overstepping its bounds in striking down the West Virginia law. He said, too, that freedom of religion did not allow individuals to break laws simply because of religious conscience. Frankfurter argued, "Otherwise each individual could set up his own censor against obedience to laws conscientiously deemed for the public good by those whose business it is to make laws."

Frankfurter's response to Jackson's systematic destruction of his Gobitis decision was one of anger, and Justices Roberts and Murphy tried to get him to revise his opinion, arguing that the first two lines were "much too personal". However, Frankfurter ignored the advice of his fellow justices, taking the overruling of his Gobitis decision as a personal affront and insisting on speaking his mind.

Frankfurter began with a reference to his Jewish roots: "One who belongs to the most vilified and persecuted minority in history is not likely to be insensible to the freedoms guaranteed by our Constitution." This was the passage Justices Roberts and Frank Murphy felt was out of place. Frankfurter, however, insisted that the passage was necessary since he claimed he was "literally flooded with letters" following the Court's decision in Gobitis that said he should be more sensitive to the protection of minorities due to his Jewish heritage. Frankfurter's dissent continued, "Were my purely personal attitudes relevant I should wholeheartedly associate myself with the generally libertarian views in the Court's opinion. ... But as judges we are neither Jew nor Gentile, neither Catholic nor agnostic."

Having responded to his critics and the court's reversal on a personal level. He now responded on a judicial one, with the remainder of his opinion focusing on judicial restraint. "As a member of this Court, I am not justified in writing my private notions of policy into the Constitution. ... It can never be emphasized too much that one's own opinion about the wisdom or evil of a law should be excluded altogether when one is doing one's duty on the bench."

Frankfurter continued, arguing that if the court is frequently striking down laws, it is circumventing the democratic process, since the court cannot work to reach a compromise. It either strikes down a law or lets it stand; it cannot simply modify or qualify a law as a legislature can.

Finally, Frankfurter rejected Justice Stone's rational-basis test that Stone laid out in United States v. Carolene Products Co. (1938). Instead, Frankfurter focused on his belief that there were no provisions within the Constitution that occupied a "preferred position" over others.

Subsequent history 
The majority opinion in Barnette is considered one of the court's greatest and most sweeping statements about the fundamental freedoms established by the Bill of Rights. After Barnette the court began to turn away from the belief–action doctrine (see Reynolds v. United States for discussion) altogether, creating a religious exemption for believers of different creeds. In Sherbert v. Verner (1963), for example, the court upheld a Seventh-day Adventist's claim to unemployment benefits even though she declined to make herself available to work on Saturday (her sabbath) as the law required. In Wisconsin v. Yoder (1972), the court upheld the right of Amish parents not to send their children to public schools past the eighth grade.

In a 2006 proceedings cosponsored by the Justice Robert H. Jackson Center and the Supreme Court Historical Society, Supreme Court law clerks from the Barnette court were on a panel with the two eponymous Barnetts. Just as she and her sister had been in 1942, Gathie Barnett Edmonds noted that her own son was also sent to the principal's office for not saluting the flag.

See also 
 Wooley v. Maynard (1977)
 Criticism of the Pledge of Allegiance
 Freedom of speech in the United States
 List of United States Supreme Court cases, volume 319
 Persecution of Jehovah's Witnesses in Nazi Germany

Footnotes

References

Further reading

External links 
 
 
 First Amendment Library entry on West Virginia State Board of Education v. Barnett
 What We Owe Jehovah's Witnesses, by Sarah Barringer Gordon, April/May 2011 American History magazine; article on Barnette's effects on Constitutional Law.
 State Board of Education Resolution on Salute to the Flag West Virginia State Board of Education, Record of Proceedings

1943 in education
1943 in religion
1943 in United States case law
1943 in West Virginia
American Civil Liberties Union litigation
Public education in West Virginia
Flag controversies in the United States
Legal history of West Virginia
Pledge of Allegiance
Jehovah's Witnesses litigation in the United States
United States education case law
United States Free Speech Clause case law
United States Supreme Court decisions that overrule a prior Supreme Court decision
United States Supreme Court cases of the Stone Court
Christianity and law in the 20th century
United States Supreme Court cases